The Concord Poetry Center is a non-profit organization founded in March, 2004, by poet and critic Joan Houlihan. Located at the Emerson Umbrella Center for the Arts, in Concord, Massachusetts, the Concord Poetry Center was established as an independent (non-university affiliated) organization in MetroWest and the Greater Boston area with an exclusive emphasis on activities and services for poets and lovers of poetry. Members have use of a library of journals, access to the poetry room, discount for classes, membership in an online discussion list, and participation in member readings. The center holds lectures, tributes, panel discussions, and public readings by some of the most renowned poets of our time, including former and current Poet Laureate Robert Pinsky, current Poet Laureate Donald Hall, and Pulitzer Prize winner Franz Wright as well as many area poets. The center's programs and activities take place in the fall and spring and include workshops, seminars, online courses, and community-based readings.

External links 
 

American poetry
Poetry organizations
Concord, Massachusetts
Non-profit organizations based in Massachusetts
2004 establishments in Massachusetts